The table tennis competition at the 2017 Games of the Small States of Europe took place from 30 May to 3 June 2017 at the Kursaal Congress Center in the City of San Marino. Compared to previous competition at Games of the Small States of Europe, two new events were added, men's and women's team events, bringing total number to 6 events.

Medal summary

Medal table

Medalists

References

External links 
Results book

Games of the Small States of Europe
2017 Games of the Small States of Europe
2017
Table tennis in San Marino